The 1931 Baltimore mayoral election was held on Tuesday May 5. saw the return of Howard W. Jackson to the mayoralty for a second nonconsecutive term.

General election
The general election was held May 5.

References

Baltimore mayoral
Mayoral elections in Baltimore
Baltimore